Robert Wayne Dodd (born March 14, 1973) is an American former professional baseball pitcher, who played in Major League Baseball (MLB) for the Philadelphia Phillies for a single season, in 1998.

Early life and career 
Dodd was born in Kansas City, Kansas. He attended Plano Senior High School in the north Dallas suburb of Plano, Texas, and played for the Plano Wildcats high school baseball team.

Dodd attended the University of Florida in Gainesville, Florida, where he played for coach Joe Arnold's Florida Gators baseball team in National Collegiate Athletic Association (NCAA) competition in 1994.

Dodd was drafted by the Philadelphia Phillies in the fourteenth round of the 1994 MLB Draft as a pitcher. He appeared in 4 games (5 innings) at the major league level. In a strange twist, in Dodd's final MLB appearance he pitched 1 scoreless inning (top of the 9th) with the Phillies trailing 7–1. The team rallied for 7 runs in the bottom of the inning giving him his only MLB win.

In the 2000s, Dodd was diagnosed with diabetes.

See also 

 Florida Gators
 List of Florida Gators baseball players
 Philadelphia Phillies all-time roster

Bibliography 

 Engelhardt, Brian C. "Two from the bullpen", Reading Phillies.  (April 28, 2005)

References

External links

1973 births
Living people
Florida Gators baseball players
Major League Baseball pitchers
Sportspeople from Kansas City, Kansas
Sportspeople from Plano, Texas
Philadelphia Phillies players
Somerset Patriots players
Baseball players from Kansas
Batavia Clippers players
Clearwater Phillies players
Reading Phillies players
Scranton/Wilkes-Barre Red Barons players